King James is a play written by Rajiv Joseph, which premiered in March 2022 at the Steppenwolf Theatre in Chicago, under the direction of Kenny Leon. The play's action is launched when two characters meet: Matt (Chris Perfetti), a Cleveland bartender with Cavaliers tickets he needs to sell, and Shawn (Glenn Davis), a writer who has recently published a short story and wants to buy tickets for the Cleveland Cavaliers 2003–2004 season – the first season with LeBron James playing.

Development
Rajiv Joseph began to write the play in 2017, motivated to "preserve some of the experience of following and cheering" for LeBron James. "Rajiv's first draft had a lot of basketball in it," according to Glenn Davis, who is a long-term friend of Rajiv Joseph, but "as each new draft came in, the specifics about basketball began to disappear because Rajiv wanted to make sure this play was about friendship."

The play, a co-production of the Steppenwolf and the Center Theatre Group in Los Angeles was originally scheduled for production during their 2019–2020 seasons. The premiere was delayed for two years due to the COVID-19 pandemic, until March 13, 2022 in Chicago and June 1, 2022 in Los Angeles. Rajiv Joseph, Glenn Davis and Kenny Leon, who is directing at Steppenwolf for the first time, are all longtime basketball aficionados, but not so much for Chris Perfetti. This added depth to the play's development at Steppenwolf as being both about and not about basketball – about how sports helps to bring people together. As Rajiv Joseph said to Sarah Bahr of the New York Times: "Sometimes a love of the game is the only way people who have difficulty expressing their feelings are able to articulate them."

Synopsis
The play's drama derives from the ups and downs of Matt's and Shawn's friendship, the ebbs and flows of their two careers, and the comings and goings of LeBron James. The play's four scenes take place at the time of Matt's and Shawn's initial meeting during the 2003–2004 season, six and one half years later at the time of "The Decision", when James announced he was abandoning Cleveland for Miami, in 2014, when James returned to Cleveland, and in 2016, the end of Cleveland's championship drought.

Critical reception
A number of reviewers comment on the balance between two aspects of the play: its deep dive into basketball, and its portrayal of communication between sports fans. In his Sun-Times review, Steven Oxman wrote that the play has "brisk and witty dialogue" but that some attendees might expect more "thematic darkness or sociopolitical-aesthetic-spiritual contemplation," given Rajiv Joseph's earlier plays. Joey Morona suggested that the assumed level of basketball know-how may be overly esoteric for those who are not Cleveland sports fans. Chris Jones, of The Chicago Tribune, emphasizes that the play is essentially about friendship, saying that it "tells a very moving, accessible and openhearted story of two friends." He also suggested that the audience's hunger for more basketball content might be met "in future drafts by amping up the LeBron and other NBA content"!

Barbara Vitello of suburban Chicago's Daily Herald stressed the primacy that communication and friendship play, with all the ups and downs, in the dramatic arc of the piece. Nancy Bishop described it, in Third Coast Review, as "a buddy play in the best sense of that term" and suggests that people unfamiliar with the arcana of basketball might want to "get educated with a lot of basketball" before going. Bishop, Vitello and Oxman all praised the enhancement of the "pre-game" and the "half-time" music by DJ Khloe Janel. Sheri Flanders of The Chicago Reader noted the Steppenwolf costume design by Samantha C. Jones as well as Todd Rosenthal's highly detailed scenic design.

References

External links
King James at Steppenwolf.org

2022 plays
American plays
Cleveland in fiction
Plays set in Ohio
Works set in the 2000s
Works set in the 2010s